John Graydon (1666–1726) was an English navy officer.

John Graydon may also refer to:

 John Graydon (politician) (1693–1774), Irish politician
 Michael John Graydon Soroka (born 1997), Canadian baseball pitcher

See also
 Graydon (disambiguation)
 Graydon (name)